The Ballads is a 1999 compilation album by REO Speedwagon. It features some of the band's previously recorded hit ballads as well as two additional songs, Just For You and Til The Rivers Run Dry.

Track listing

Personnel
REO Speedwagon 
Kevin Cronin - lead vocals, rhythm guitar
Dave Amato - lead guitar, backing vocals on tracks 1, 6, 9, 11, 12 and 14
Neal Doughty - keyboards
Bruce Hall - bass, backing vocals
Bryan Hitt - drums on tracks 1, 6, 9, 11, 12 and 14

Other Personnel
Gary Richrath - lead guitar on tracks 2, 3, 4, 5, 7, 8, 10, 13, 15 and 16
Alan Gratzer - drums, backing vocals on tracks 2, 3, 4, 5, 7, 8, 10, 13 and 15 
Jesse Harms - keyboards on tracks 11 and 14
Graham Lear - drums on track 16

Release history

References

1999 greatest hits albums
REO Speedwagon albums
Epic Records compilation albums